"I Beg Your Pardon" is the debut single by Canadian synth-pop duo Kon Kan, from their 1989 debut album Move to Move. It was written by Kon Kan member Barry Harris, and American musician Joe South, who is credited due to the song's sampling of Lynn Anderson's 1970 hit "Rose Garden", which he wrote.

"I Beg Your Pardon" also contains samples of other songs, including GQ's "Disco Nights (Rock-Freak)", Silver Convention's "Get Up and Boogie", and Spagna's "Call Me". Music critic James Masterton wrote that the song was one of the first big club hits to contain prominent samples.

The song was a hit, reaching the top twenty in a number of countries including the UK and U.S., where it peaked at numbers 5 and 15, respectively.

Barry Harris said that the song was "the question to Lynn Anderson's 'Rose Garden' answer." It was Harris's first studio project, and was initially released on an unknown independent record label in Toronto.

Background
Barry Harris took inspiration from the Pet Shop Boys' 1987 single "Always on My Mind", which had repurposed Willie Nelson's 1982 country ballad into an upbeat synthpop song. Harris wanted to do the same with Lynn Anderson's 1970 country hit "Rose Garden". As he was a DJ at the time, he was "exploding with ideas" for little sounds he incorporated into "I Beg Your Pardon". Harris said, "The lyrics were about my first love relationship. As I had never really attempted to write lyrics seriously before, I already had the melody of the verses in my head so I simply started with a 'Once Upon a Time' idea… 'there once was a time and there once was a way…' and it pretty much flowed from there."

Musically, in this song, Harris also wanted to emulate "Bass (How Low Can You Go)" by Simon Harris, as well as "S'Express", two sample-based hits from 1988. The result was unique; Masterton wrote that Kon Kan's pop song "sounded like very little else on the market," and was quickly rewarded with chart success.

Charts

Weekly charts

Year-end charts

References

1988 songs
1988 debut singles
Kon Kan songs
Songs written by Joe South
Atlantic Records singles
Juno Award for Dance Recording of the Year recordings